Hanns Thaddäus Hoyer (19 September 1886 – 16 January 1960) was a German painter. His work was part of the painting event in the art competition at the 1928 Summer Olympics.

References

1886 births
1960 deaths
20th-century German painters
20th-century German male artists
German male painters
Olympic competitors in art competitions
People from Viersen (district)